Modélisation Mathématique et Analyse Numérique (M2AN) is a journal published by EDP Sciences on behalf of the Société de Mathématiques Appliquées et Industrielles (SMAI) that focuses on mathematical and computational modeling and numerical analysis.

References

Mathematics journals